Bhagwant Nagar Vidhan Sabha seat is one of the constituencies of Uttar Pradesh Legislative Assembly in India. It covers the city of Bhagwantnagar in Unnao district of Uttar Pradesh, India.

Bhagwantnagar is one of six assembly constituencies in the Unnao Lok Sabha constituency. Since 2008, this assembly constituency is numbered 166 amongst 403 constituencies.

Members of Vidhan Sabha 
 1957 : Bhagwati Singh Visharad (PSP) 
 1962 : Dev Dutt (INC), defeated Bhagwati Singh Visharad (PSP)
 1967 : Bhagwati Singh Visharad (PSP) 
 1969 : Bhagwati  Visharad (INC, his new party) 
 1974 : Bhagwati Singh Visharad (INC), defeated Chaudhari Deoki Nandan (Jana Sangh) 
 1977 : Deoki Nandan (JNP), defeated Bhagwati Singh Visharad (INC) 
 1980 : Bhagwati Singh Visharad (INC-I) 
 1985 : Bhagwati Singh Visarad (INC) 
 1989 : Devki Nandan (BJP), defeated Bhagwati Singh Visharad (INC)
 1991 : Bhagwati Singh Visharad (INC) 
 1993 : Devaki Nandan (BJP), defeated Bhagwati Singh Visharad (INC) who finished fourth  
 1996 : Kripa Shankar Singh (BJP). (First election here since 1957 that Bhagawati Singh did not contest.)
 2002 : Natthu Singh (BSP) 
 2007 : Kripa Shankar Singh (BSP) 
 2012 : Kuldeep Singh Sengar (Samajwadi Party)
 2017 : Hriday Narayan Dikshit (BJP), defeated  Kripa Shankar Singh (Lok Dal) who came fourth.
 2022 : Ashutosh Shukla (BJP), defeated Ankit Singh Parihar

Election results

2022

2017
 Hriday Narayan Dikshit (BJP) : 103,698 votes 
 Shashank Shekhr SinghBahujan Samaj Party : 50,332

1977 Vidhan Sabha Elections
 Devaki Nandan (Janata Party) : 36,428 votes 
 Bhagwati Singh Visharad (INC) : 25,817

References

External links
 

Assembly constituencies of Uttar Pradesh
Unnao district